Villa Delia is a suburb of Maldonado, Uruguay.

Geography
The suburb is located on Route 38 and borders the suburbs Cerro Pelado and La Sonrisa to the west, Barrio Los Aromos to the north, and Pinares - Las Delicias to the south.

Population
In 2011 Villa Delia had a population of 1,703.
 
Source: Instituto Nacional de Estadística de Uruguay

References

External links
 INE map of Maldonado, Villa Delia, La Sonrisa, Cerro Pelado, Los Aromos and Pinares-Las Delicias

Populated places in the Maldonado Department